Polpettone di melanzane (Italian language "eggplant loaf") is a peasant dish originally from Levante Genoa, with many variants in other provinces of Liguria. It incorporates fresh summer products and inexpensive meats, as well as aromatic herbs. The recipe can be made with other summertime vegetables such as squash or beans.

Preparation

Cooked eggplants are combined with egg and parmesan and mixed by hand to form a type of "dough" that forms the "loaf" part of the polpettone. It is filled with salami and mozzarella, rolled to form the loaf, coated with a little flour and fried.

See also
 Cuisine of Liguria
 List of Italian dishes

References

Cuisine of Liguria
Vegetable dishes
Eggplant dishes
Cheese dishes
Stuffed dishes
Fried foods